is a single by Irish female vocal group The Nolans, from their 1980 album Making Waves. Released exclusively in Japan by Epic Records on March 21, 1981, the single was a commercial success, selling over 270,000 copies. The song also made the Nolans the first European act to win the Grand Prix at the Tokyo Music Festival

Track listing

Chart positions and certifications

Wink version 

"Sexy Music" was covered in Japanese by the idol duo Wink. Released on 28 March 1990 by Polystar Records, it was their seventh single, with Japanese lyrics written by Neko Oikawa.

The single became the duo's fifth and final No. 1 on Oricon's singles chart. It sold over 329,000 copies and was certified Gold by the RIAJ.

Track listing

Chart positions 
Weekly charts

Year-end charts

Certifications

Other cover versions 
In 1981, the song was covered and re-lyriced by Taiwanese singer Frankie Kao (高凌風, Gāo Língfēng) as "A Fire in Winter" (Dōngtiānli de Yì Bǎ Huŏ), which was later covered, with much more success, by Fei Xiang (費翔, Fèi Xiáng). Having had some success prior, he reached superstar status almost overnight when in 1987, he performed this song in CCTV's new year gala. The song became an instant hit in Mainland China.

The song was also covered in Korean by the South Korean band Q. Big (큐빅) for their 2003 album "In The Groove".

References

External links 
The Nolans version
 

Wink version
 
 

1980 songs
1981 singles
1990 singles
The Nolans songs
Wink (duo) songs
Epic Records singles
Japanese-language songs
Songs with lyrics by Neko Oikawa
Oricon International Singles Chart number-one singles
Oricon Weekly number-one singles